The name Hamilton probably originated in the village of Hamilton, Leicestershire, England, but bearers of that name became established in the 13th century in Lanarkshire, Scotland. The town of Hamilton, South Lanarkshire was named after the family some time before 1445. Contemporary Hamiltons are either descended from the original noble family, or descended from people named after the town.

Scottish nobility
 Duke of Hamilton, a title in the Peerage of Scotland
 Douglas-Hamilton, the family surname of the Dukes of Hamilton and Earls of Selkirk
 Duke of Abercorn, a title in the Peerage of Ireland, the dukes having the surname Hamilton
 Earl of Haddington, a title in the Peerage of Scotland, the earls having the surname Bailie-Hamilton
 Lord Belhaven and Stenton, a title in the Peerage of Scotland, the lords having the surname Hamilton
 Baron Hamilton (disambiguation)
 Lord Hamilton (disambiguation)
 Clan Hamilton

People with the surname

Names borne by several notable people

Adam Hamilton (disambiguation)
Alexander Hamilton (disambiguation) (including Alex Hamilton)
Archibald Hamilton (disambiguation) (including Archie Hamilton)
Andrew Hamilton (disambiguation) (including Andy Hamilton)
Ann Hamilton (disambiguation)
Anne Hamilton (disambiguation)
Anthony Hamilton (disambiguation)
Barbara Hamilton (disambiguation)
Bob Hamilton (disambiguation)
Brian Hamilton (disambiguation)
Carl Hamilton (disambiguation)
Carolyn Hamilton (disambiguation)
Charles Hamilton (disambiguation)
Claud Hamilton (disambiguation)
Clayton Hamilton (disambiguation)
Curtis Hamilton (disambiguation)
Daniel Hamilton (disambiguation)
David Hamilton (disambiguation) (including Dave Hamilton and Davey Hamilton)
Diana Hamilton (disambiguation)
Doug Hamilton (disambiguation)
Douglas Hamilton (disambiguation)
Douglas Douglas-Hamilton (disambiguation)
Duncan Hamilton (disambiguation)
Edward Hamilton (disambiguation) (including Ed Hamilton)
Elizabeth Hamilton (disambiguation)
Eric Hamilton
Francis Hamilton (disambiguation)
Frank Hamilton (disambiguation)
Fred Hamilton (disambiguation)
Frederick Hamilton (disambiguation)
Gary Hamilton (disambiguation)
Gavin Hamilton (disambiguation)
George Hamilton (disambiguation)
Gerald Hamilton (disambiguation)
Gordon Hamilton (disambiguation)
Grace Hamilton (disambiguation)
Gustavus Hamilton (disambiguation)
Henry Hamilton (disambiguation)
Hugh Hamilton (disambiguation)
Hugo Hamilton (disambiguation)
Iain Hamilton (disambiguation)
Ian Hamilton (disambiguation)
Jack Hamilton (disambiguation)
James Hamilton (disambiguation)
Jamie Hamilton (disambiguation)
Jane Hamilton (disambiguation)
Jim Hamilton (disambiguation)
Jeff Hamilton (disambiguation) (including Jeffrey Hamilton)
Jo Hamilton (disambiguation)
John Hamilton (disambiguation)
Joseph Hamilton (disambiguation) (including Joe Hamilton, Jody Hamilton, and Joey Hamilton)
Justin Hamilton (disambiguation)
Keith Hamilton (disambiguation)
Kyle Hamilton (disambiguation)
Lee Hamilton (disambiguation)
Lewis Hamilton (disambiguation) 
Lynn Hamilton (disambiguation)
Malcolm Hamilton (disambiguation)
Margaret Hamilton (disambiguation)
Mark Hamilton (disambiguation)
Mary Hamilton (disambiguation)
Matt Hamilton (disambiguation)
Michael Hamilton (disambiguation) (including Mike Hamilton)
Neil Hamilton (disambiguation)
Nigel Hamilton (disambiguation)
Patrick Hamilton (disambiguation)
Paul Hamilton (disambiguation)
Peter Hamilton (disambiguation) (including Pete Hamilton)
Raymond Hamilton (disambiguation) (including Ray Hamilton)
Reginald Hamilton (disambiguation) (including Reggie Hamilton and Reg Hamilton)
Richard Hamilton (disambiguation) (including Rick Hamilton)
Robert Hamilton (disambiguation) (including Bob Hamilton and Bobby Hamilton)
Russ Hamilton (disambiguation)
Scott Hamilton (disambiguation)
Sam Hamilton (disambiguation)
Steve Hamilton (disambiguation) (including Steven Hamilton or Stephen Hamilton)
Sue Hamilton (disambiguation)
Thomas Hamilton (disambiguation) (including Tom Hamilton)
Tim Hamilton (disambiguation)
Wendy Hamilton (disambiguation)
William Hamilton (disambiguation) (including Bill Hamilton, Billy Hamilton and Willie Hamilton)

Individuals

A. E. Hamilton (1873–1962), South Australian company director
Aaron Hamilton, Australian cricket coach
Al Hamilton (born 1946), Canadian ice hockey player
Alfred Douglas-Hamilton, 13th Duke of Hamilton (1862–1940), Scottish nobleman and sailor.
Alfred Starr Hamilton (1914–2005), U.S. poet
Alice Hamilton (1869–1970), U.S. medical researcher
Allen Hamilton (1798–1864), founding father of Fort Wayne, Indiana
Alvin Hamilton (1912–2004), Canadian politician
Alwyn Hamilton, author of Rebel of the Sands
Amanda Hamilton, Scottish nutritionist and television presenter
Andrea Hamilton, Peruvian fine-art photographer
Angelica Hamilton (1784–1857), daughter of Alexander Hamilton and Eliza Schuyler Hamilton
Angus Douglas-Hamilton, 15th Duke of Hamilton (1938–2010), Scottish nobleman
Angus Falconer Douglas-Hamilton (1863–1915), Scottish recipient of the Victoria Cross
Anna Hamilton (1864–1935), French medical doctor
Anne Hamilton, 3rd Duchess of Hamilton (1631–1716), Scottish noblewoman
Antoine Hamilton (1646–1720), French classical author
Antony Hamilton (1952–1995), Australian actor
Argus Hamilton, U.S. comedian
Arthur Hamilton, U.S. songwriter ("Cry Me a River") 
Arthur Hamilton, Lord Hamilton (born 1942), Scottish judge
Ashley Hamilton (born 1974), U.S. actor
Augustus Hamilton (1853–1913), English/New Zealand biologist and ethnologist
Ben Hamilton (born 1977), U.S. football player
Bernie Hamilton (born 1928), U.S. actor
Bethany Hamilton (born 1990), U.S. surfer
Betty Hamilton (1904–1994), British Trotskyist
Björn Hamilton (born 1945), Swedish politician
Blayney Hamilton (1872–1946), Irish cricketer
Brutus Hamilton (1900–1970), U.S. athlete
Bryan Hamilton (born 1946), Northern Irish football player
Bryce Hamilton (born 2000), American basketball player
Caleb Hamilton (born 1995), American baseball player
Carrick Hamilton, Scottish footballer
Carrie Hamilton (1963–2002), U.S. actress
Chico Hamilton (1921–2013), U.S. jazz band leader
Christine Hamilton (born 1949), English television personality, wife of former MP Neil Hamilton
Chuck Hamilton (born 1939), Canadian ice hockey player
Cicely Hamilton (1872–1952), English actress and writer
Clark Hamilton, U.S. politician
Clive Hamilton, Australian Professor of Public Ethics
Clyde H. Hamilton (1934–2010), American judge
Constance Hamilton (1862–1945), Canadian politician
Cornelius S. Hamilton (1821–1867), U.S. politician
Cosmo Hamilton (1870–1942), English playwright and novelist
Craig Hamilton (born 1979), Scottish rugby union player
Cuthbert Hamilton (1885–1959), British artist
Cyril Hamilton (1909–1941), English cricketer
DaeSean Hamilton (born 1995), American football player
Dana Hamilton (born 1950), U.S. hammered dulcimer player
Dale E. Hamilton (1909–2002), U.S. collegiate coach
Darius Hamilton (born 1993), American football player
Darryl Hamilton (1964–2015), U.S. baseball player
DaVon Hamilton (born 1997), American football player
Dennis Hamilton (1944–2012), U.S. basketball player
Derrick Hamilton (born 1981), U.S. football player
Derrick Hamilton (basketball) (born 1966), American basketball player
Des Hamilton (born 1976), English footballer
Diane Hamilton (born 1925), U.S. heiress; founder of Tradition Records
Dianne Hamilton (1934–2021), American politician
Don Hamilton (1887–1959), U.S. football player
Donald Hamilton (1916–2006), U.S. writer
Donald Cameron Hamilton (1883–1925), New Zealand rugby union player and cricketer
Doreen Hamilton (born 1951), Canadian politician
Dougie Hamilton (born 1993), Canadian ice hockey player
Douglas Gibson Hamilton (born 1941), Australian chess master
Eamon Hamilton, musician
Earl Hamilton (1891–1968), U.S. baseball player
Earl J. Hamilton (1899–1989), U.S. historian
Edith Hamilton (1867–1963), U.S. writer
Eliza Hamilton Holly (1799–1859), daughter of Alexander Hamilton and Eliza Schuyler Hamilton 
Edmond Hamilton, U.S. sci-fi writer
Emily Hamilton (born 1971), British actress
Emma, Lady Hamilton (1761–1815), mistress of Lord Nelson
Erin Hamilton (born 1968), U.S. singer
Lord Ernest Hamilton (1858–1939), British politician
Eugene Hamilton (1910–2005), U.S. obstetrician, writer, and medical researcher
Eugene Lee-Hamilton (1845–1907), English poet
Fabian Hamilton (born 1955), British politician
Filippa Palmstierna Hamilton (born 1985), Swedish-French fashion model
Finley Hamilton (1886–1940), U.S. politician
Forrest Hamilton (born 1931), American basketball player
Franklin Elmer Ellsworth Hamilton (1866–1918), U.S. theologian;  Bishop of the Methodist Episcopal Church
Frederic C. Hamilton (1927–2016), U.S. oilman and philanthropist
Gary Hamilton (footballer born 1980), footballer from Northern Ireland
Gary Hamilton (footballer born 1965), Scottish former footballer
Gay Hamilton (born 1943), Scottish actress
Gene Hamilton (1910-2000), American radio announcer
Gene Hamilton, U.S. mountain bike racer
Geoff Hamilton (1936–1996), British gardener and broadcaster
Gilbert Van Tassel Hamilton (1877–1943), U.S. physician and writer
Gustav Hamilton (late 1650s – 1691), Anglo-Irish governor of Enniskillen
Guy Hamilton (1922–2016), English film director
Hamilton Hamilton (1847–1928) English born, American painter
Hans Hamilton (c. 1758 – 1822), Anglo-Irish politician
Hans Hamilton, 4th Baron HolmPatrick (born 1955), British politician
Harley Hamilton (conductor) (1861–1933), U.S. conductor, composer and violinist
Harold P. Hamilton (1924–2003), U.S. college president and state government official
Harry Hamilton (born 1962), U.S. football player.
Lady Henrietta Hamilton (1780–1857), painter; wife of Sir Charles Hamilton
Holly Hamilton, British journalist and presenter
Homer Hamilton (1913–1997), Canadian politician
Hubert Hamilton (1861–1914), British general
Ion Hamilton, 1st Baron HolmPatrick (1839–1898), Anglo-Irish politician
Isaac Hamilton (born 1994), U.S. basketball player
Isaac Miller Hamilton (1864–1952), U.S. banker and politician
Jacinta Hamilton (born 1983), Australian basketball player
Jack Hamilton (sports executive) (1886–1976), Canadian ice hockey and multi-sport executive
Jackie Hamilton (1937–2003), British comedian
Jackie Hamilton (ice hockey) (born 1925), Canadian ice hockey player
Jan Hamilton (born 1964), first officer in the British Army to complete gender reassignment from male to female
Jane Hamilton-Merritt (born 1947), American photojournalist
Janet Hamilton (1795–1873), Scottish poet
Jon Hamilton, American radio science correspondent
Jordan Hamilton (basketball) (born 1990), American basketball player in the Israel Basketball Premier League
Jordan Hamilton (soccer), Canadian soccer forward
José Ignacio García Hamilton (born 1943), Argentine writer
Josh Hamilton (actor) (born 1969), U.S. actor
Josh Hamilton (born 1981), U.S. baseball player
Judith Hamilton, Canadian theatre director
Julian Hamilton (born 1976), Australian musician
Kathleen Hamilton, Duchess of Abercorn (1905–1990), Mistress of the Robes to Queen Elizabeth II
Kelly Hamilton (born 1949), American military pilot
Kevan Hamilton (born 1934), Australian rules footballer
Kenneth Hamilton Scottish pianist
Kim Hamilton (1932–2013), U.S. actress
Kipp Hamilton (1935–1981), U.S. actress
LaDarius Hamilton (born 1998), American football player
Laird Hamilton (born 1964), U.S. big-wave surfer
Lance Hamilton (born 1973), New Zealand cricketer
Larry Hamilton (1931–1996), U.S. professional wrestler
Larry Hamilton (musician) (1951–2011), American blues and rhythm and blues singer and songwriter
Laurell K. Hamilton, U.S. writer 
Laurentine Hamilton (1826–1882), U.S. cleric 
Leonard Hamilton (born 1948), U.S. basketball coach
Lewis Hamilton (born 1985), British Formula One driver
Lewis Hamilton (footballer) (born 1984), English footballer
Lillias Hamilton (1858–1925), English doctor and author
Linda Hamilton (born 1956), U.S. actress
Lisa Gay Hamilton, U.S. actress
Lloyd Hamilton (1891–1935), U.S. silent film actor
Lois Hamilton (1943–1999), U.S. model, author, actress, artist and aviator
Lucas Hamilton (born 1996), Australian cyclist
Lucy Hamilton (also known as China Burg), member of the No Wave band Mars
Lyn Hamilton, Canadian author of archaeological mystery novels
Lynell Hamilton (born 1985), U.S. football player
Lynley Hamilton, Australian cricketer
Lynne Hamilton, British singer, Evangelist minister
Mahlon Hamilton (1880–1960), U.S. actor
Malyk Hamilton (born 1999), Canadian soccer player
Marc Hamilton (born 1944), French Canadian singer from Quebec 
Marci Hamilton, U.S. constitutional law scholar
Marcus Hamilton (American football) (born 1984), U.S. football player
Marguerite Hamilton (died 1998), U.S. author
Marvin Hamilton (born 1988), English footballer
Masha Hamilton, author and journalist
Maximilian Reichsgraf von Hamilton (1714–1776), prince bishop of Olmütz
Max Hamilton (1912–1988), German-born British medical statistician
Melinda Page Hamilton, U.S. actress
Melissa Hamilton (born 1989), Northern Irish ballet dancer
Michelle Hamilton (born 1948), U.S. Playboy Playmate, model
Milo Hamilton (1927–2015), U.S. sportscaster
Milton H. Hamilton, Jr (born 1932), U.S. politician; former majority leader in the Tennessee State Senate
Morgan C. Hamilton (1809–1893), U.S. politician
Murray Hamilton (1923–1986), U.S. actor
Natasha Hamilton (born 1982), English singer and member of Atomic Kitten
Nick Hamilton (born 1959), U.S. professional wrestling referee
Norman R. Hamilton (1877–1964), U.S. politician
Normani Hamilton (born 1996), U.S. singer professionally known as Normani
Page Hamilton (born 1960), U.S. guitarist, singer and record producer
Paris Hamilton (born 1981), U.S. football player
Patricia Hamilton (born 1938), U.S. actress
Paula Hamilton, U.S. supermodel
Paulette Hamilton (born 1962/1963), British politician
Pauline Kruger Hamilton (1870–1919), U.S. photographer
Peggy-Kay Hamilton (1922–1959), U.S. geologist
Pep Hamilton, U.S. football coach
Philip Hamilton (1782–1801), son of Alexander Hamilton, dueling fatality
Philip Hamilton II (1802–1884), American lawyer and son of Alexander Hamilton
Phillip Hamilton (born 1961), U.S. writer
Philippe Hamilton-Rollings (born 1993), Ukrainian football player
Pierpont M. Hamilton (1898–1982), United States Army Air Forces officer
R. H. Hamilton, U.S. sportsman; first head coach of the Baylor College football program from 1899 to 1900
Ralph Hamilton (1921–1993), U.S. professional basketball player
Ramone Hamilton (born 2006), American actor
Remy Hamilton (born 1974), U.S. football player
Robin Hamilton, U.S. politician
Roland Hamilton (1886–1953), British politician
Ronald Hamilton, American tenor
Ronnie Hamilton (born 1945), Scottish footballer
Roy Hamilton (1929–1969), American singer
Roy "Royalty" Hamilton (born 1980) U.S. songwriter
Roy Hamilton (basketball) (born 1957), American basketball player and sports television producer
Ruth Hamilton (1898–2008), U.S. radio talk show host and politician
Schuyler Hamilton, (1822–1903), U.S. soldier
Sean Hamilton US radio host
Shaun Dion Hamilton (born 1995), American football player
Simon Hamilton, Northern Ireland politician
Suzanna Hamilton (born 1960), English actress
Suzy Favor-Hamilton (born 1968), U.S. middle-distance runner
Tang Hamilton (born 1978), U.S. basketball player
Todd Hamilton, U.S. professional golfer
Trevor Hamilton (born 1982), Northern Irish murderer
Tova Hamilton, Jamaican politician
Tyler Hamilton (born 1971), U.S. professional road bicycle racer
Tyler Hamilton (reporter) (born 1970), Canadian reporter
Venson Hamilton (born 1977), U.S.-Spanish basketball player
Victoria Hamilton (born 1971), British actress
W. D. Hamilton, British evolutionary biologist
W. O. Hamilton, U.S. athletics coach
Walter Alfred Hamilton (1863–1955), Australian politician
Walter Kerr Hamilton (1808–1869), Anglican Bishop of Salisbury
Walter Richard Pollock Hamilton (1856–1879), Irish recipient of the Victoria Cross
Wes Hamilton (born 1953), U.S. football player
Wilbur H. Hamilton (1909–1964), American businessman and politician
William Peter Hamilton (1867–1929), Wall Street Journal editor
Willoughby Hamilton (1864–1943), Irish tennis player
Zendon Hamilton (born 1975), U.S. basketball player

People with the given name
Hamilton Shirley Amerasinghe (1913–1980), Sri Lankan Sinhala diplomat 
Hamilton Basso (1904–1964), American writer
Hamilton Bohannon (1942–2020), American percussionist, band leader, songwriter, and record producer
Hamilton Camp (1934-2005), British actor
Hamílton Hênio Ferreira Calheiros (born 1980), Brazilian-Togolese footballer
Hamilton Fish (disambiguation), several people
Hamilton Green (born 1934), prime minister of Guyana
Hamilton Harty (1879–1941), Irish composer
Hamilton Jordan (1944–2008), American politician
Hamilton Luske (1903–1968), American animator and film director
Hamilton Masakadza (born 1983), Zimbabwean cricketer
Hamilton Morris (born 1987), American journalist and pharmacologist
Hamilton Paul (1773–1854), Scottish Presbyterian minister and writer
Hámilton Ricard (born 1974), Colombian footballer
Hamilton Sabot (born 1987), French gymnast
Hamilton O. Smith (born 1931), American microbiologist
Hamilton Wanasinghe, general, Commander of the Sri Lanka Army from 1988 to 1991

People with the middle name 
Antônio Hamilton Martins Mourão (born 1953), retired Brazilian Army General and Vice President of Brazil
Erskine Hamilton Childers (1905–1974), fourth President of Ireland and Fianna Fáil minister
James Hamilton Iain Kay (born 1949), Zimbabwean farmer and politician

Fictional characters

Audrey fforbes-Hamilton, character from To the Manor Born
Carl Hamilton (fictional character), spy created by Jan Guillou
Charles Hamilton, first husband of Scarlett O'Hara in Gone with the Wind
Melanie Hamilton, Scarlett O'Hara's sister-in-law from Gone with the Wind
Gil Hamilton, detective created by Larry Niven
Jack Hamilton, fictional character created by Philip K. Dick and found in the novel Eye in the Sky
Marcus Hamilton (Angel), a character from the TV series Angel
Professor Hamilton, Emil Hamilton, a supporting character from Superman comics
Hamilton Burger, the L.A. district attorney in the Perry Mason novels
Hamilton Fleming, a character from the short-lived TV series Young Americans
Hamilton Hocks, a stuffed pig character from Maggie and the Ferocious Beast
Hamilton Porter, a character from The Sandlot
Mary Rose Hamilton, character in Lolita
Holly Hamilton played by Hilary Duff in The Perfect Man
Hamilton Hamilton played by Hannah Miranda in The Adventures of Hamilton, Danger Dog
Jenna Hamilton (Ashley Rickards) in the MTV series, Awkward
Lacey Hamilton (Nikki DeLoach) in the MTV series, Awkward
Kevin Hamilton (Mike Faiola) in the MTV series, Awkward
Lisa Hamilton from the video game series, Dead or Alive
Devon Hamilton (Bryton James) on the soap opera The Young and the Restless
Hamilton Holt, character from The 39 Clues

References

External links
 

Given names
Scottish families
Scottish surnames
Surnames of Lowland Scottish origin
Surnames of Ulster-Scottish origin
English-language surnames